The men's 3000 metres steeplechase event at the 1995 Pan American Games was held at the Estadio Atletico "Justo Roman" on 22 March.

Results

References

Athletics at the 1995 Pan American Games
1995